James Murphy was an Australian politician.

He was one of Charles Cowper's 21 appointments to the New South Wales Legislative Council in May 1861, but did not take his seat. He was a member of Sydney City Council from 1857 to 1860 and served as mayor in 1860.

References

Year of birth unknown
Year of death missing
Members of the New South Wales Legislative Council
Mayors and Lord Mayors of Sydney